Gabrielle is the second studio album by English R&B artist Gabrielle. It was released in 1996 and reached number 11 in the UK Albums Chart. The album was certified Platinum in the UK.

Track listing

Personnel

Gabrielle – lead vocals
Ben Barson – acoustic guitar, bass, Fender Rhodes, piano
Matt Coldrick – guitar
Geoff Dugmore – drums
Luís Jardim – percussion

Andy Caine, Tracy Ackerman – backing vocals
The London Session Orchestra – strings
Gavyn Wright – string conductor 
Nick Ingman – string arrangements
Jamie Talbot, John Barclay, Pete Beachill, Phil Todd, Steve Sidwell – brass

Technical
Christopher Marc Potter – recording, mixing
Glen Luchford – cover photography

Charts

Weekly charts

Year-end charts

Certifications

References

1996 albums
Gabrielle (singer) albums
Go! Discs albums